Joel Timothy Houston (born 19 September 1979) is an Australian musician, songwriter, pastor, and leader in the Sydney-based band Hillsong United, a worship band of Hillsong Church.

He was co-pastor at Hillsong NYC between 2010 and 2017. He is the head of the Christian worship band Hillsong United, for which he sings, plays guitar, and writes songs. In 2008, he became the creative director at Hillsong Church. He is the oldest son of the church's Founding Pastors Brian and Bobbie Houston and grandson of Frank Houston. He has two siblings. Houston was also the bass player for the band Able, which was composed of Marty Sampson, Michael Guy Chislett and Luke Munns, which won the Channel V Leg Up competition in 2001.

Biography

Early life 
Joel is the oldest child of the Hillsong Church's founding pastors Brian and Bobbie Houston and grandson of pastor Frank Houston.

Joel has two siblings, Ben Houston (lead pastor of Hillsong Los Angeles) and Laura Toggs (pastor of the Hillsong youth ministry in Australia and also member of Hillsong Young & Free).

Houston wanted to play the piano at the age of seven. However he found an inclination to play bass and this led him to play the bass guitar for a number of Hillsong Worship albums instead.

Hillsong United and Hillsong 

Houston's debut with the Hillsong United as a vocalist was in 2002, however he had been playing bass guitar with the band for several years prior to this, and contributing various songs, including the title track from the group's debut full-length live album, Everyday. As part of Hillsong United music team, Joel Houston has helped lead worship conferences in North America, South America, Africa, Europe and Asia. He has also contributed to the main Hillsong album recordings as well, which are led by worship pastor Reuben Morgan. Many of the songs he has written or co-written are sung in churches worldwide and have been translated into 32 languages. His music has been featured on Hillsong albums that have quickly risen on both the Australian and American Christian music charts. In March 2007, Hillsong United's eighth album All of the Above debuted at No. 6 on the ARIA charts. Joel Houston has been the creative director of Hillsong since 2008. Joel was co-pastor of Hillsong NYC with Carl Lentz until Lentz's employment was terminated by Brian Houston for unnamed "moral failings".

Personal life 
Joel married Brazilian model Esther Lima in 2012, and they had a son in 2013.

External links 
 Christianity Today interview
 "The Story Behind All of the Above"  – Written by Joel Houston
 SongDiscovery.com interviews Joel Houston , 
 A Passion for His Presence article at Beliefnet
 Fresh 103.2 Interview
 BBC Heart-throb rock gods united in song
 The Bulletin interview and photo gallery

References 

Hillsong musicians
Christian music songwriters
Living people
Australian people of Tongan descent
Australian people of New Zealand descent
Australian songwriters
Australian Christian Churches people
Australian performers of Christian music
1979 births
Musicians from Sydney